WRVO Public Media is a non-profit public radio network in Oswego, New York licensed to the State University of New York at Oswego, operating from studios in the Penfield Library on the SUNY Oswego campus. Its multi-station network serves more than 20 counties in central and northern New York from flagship WRVO in Oswego, repeaters WRVD in Syracuse, WRVH in Clayton, WRVN in Utica, and WRVJ in Watertown. Low-power translators serve Geneva, Hamilton, Ithaca, Norwich and Watertown.

Programming 
WRVO programming includes regional news and public affairs and programming from NPR, American Public Media, Public Radio Exchange, the BBC World Service and other networks. WRVO currently broadcasts Morning Edition, 1A, Fresh Air, Q, Here & Now, All Things Considered, As It Happens, The Capitol Pressroom weeknights. and their old time radio program, Tuned to Yesterday every night.  On the weekend, WRVO broadcasts Travel with Rick Steves, Weekend Edition, Hidden Brain, Wait Wait... Don't Tell Me!, Says You!, This American Life, On The Media, All Things Considered, The Moth Radio Hour, New Yorker Radio Hour, TED Radio Hour, Campbell Conversations, HealthLink On Air, and more.

From 10:00 pm to midnight every day, WRVO broadcasts Tuned to Yesterday, which consists of radio dramas from the 1930s onward. BirdNote, a two-minute show about the lives of birds, airs on weekdays at 9:58 a.m. StarDate, a two-minute segment with a focus of astronomy and the night sky is heard weekdays at 6:32 p.m.

Affiliates

Translators 

Programming may also be heard on WRCU 90.1 FM in Hamilton and WSUC-FM 90.5 FM in Cortland during drive time, off-hours, and during school breaks.

These stations are collectively known as the WRVO Stations.

See full list of WRVO frequencies, broadcast network and fulltime, low-power translators at wrvo.org.

References

External links 
 
 

RVO
NPR member stations
RVO
NPR member networks
Radio stations established in 1969
1969 establishments in New York (state)
State University of New York at Oswego